Puss in Boots, sometimes also listed as Cannon Movie Tales: Puss in Boots, is a 1988 musical version of the story of Puss in Boots, starring Christopher Walken as "Puss" and Jason Connery as the youngest son who is assisted by Puss.  Carmela Marner stars as the Princess.   The film was directed by Eugene Marner, the screenplay was by Carole Lucia Satrina. It is a part of a series of films known collectively as the Cannon Movie Tales.

Plot
In this film, Puss (Christopher Walken) transforms from cat to a bespoke gentleman who requests a pair of boots, and then tries to restore the reputation of his master (Jason Connery).  When he puts his boots on, he transforms back to and from his cat form.

Cast
Christopher Walken as Puss 
Jason Connery as Corin 
Carmela Marner as Princess Vera 
Yossi Graber as the King 
Amnon Meskin as the Ogre
Elki Jacobs as  Lady Clara 
Michael Schneider as Walpole

Songs
 "Prologue"
Music by Michael Abbott 
Lyrics by Anne Pearson Crosswell
Performed by Peasant Cast

 "A Happy Cat"
Music by Michael Abbott
Lyrics by Anne Pearson Crosswell
Performed by Christopher Walken and Nick Curtis

 "I'll Watch Over You - Cat's Lullaby"
Music by Michael Abbott
Lyrics by Anne Pearson Crosswell
Performed by Christopher Walken

 "Gift for the King"
Music by Michael Abbott
Lyrics by Anne Pearson Crosswell
Performed by The King's Court

 "Love at First Sight"
Music by Michael Abbott
Lyrics by Anne Pearson Crosswell
Performed by Carmela Marner and Nick Curtis

 "Genteel"
Music by Michael Abbott
Lyrics by Anne Pearson Crosswell
Performed by Christopher Walken, Nick Curtis, Carmela Marner and Elki Jacobs

 "Love at First Sight (Reprise)"
Music by Michael Abbott
Lyrics by Anne Pearson Crosswell
Performed by Carmela Marner and Nick Curtis

 "Stick Your Neck out Now and Then"
Music by Michael Abbott
Lyrics by Anne Pearson Crosswell
Performed by Christopher Walken, Carmela Marner and Nick Curtis

 "A Happy Cat (Reprise)"
Music by Michael Abbott
Lyrics by Anne Pearson Crosswell
Performed by Christopher Walken, Carmela Marner, Elki Jacobs, Nick Curtis and Cast

See also
 Puss in Boots (1922 film)

References

External links

Puss in Boots at MGM

1988 films
1980s musical fantasy films
American musical fantasy films
Films based on Puss in Boots
Golan-Globus films
Films about animals
Films about cats
Films produced by Menahem Golan
Cannon Movie Tales
Films produced by Yoram Globus
1980s English-language films
1980s American films